Simorgh Alborz  or Alborz Phoenixes Mazar is a professional football club from Afghanistan. They play in the Afghanistan Champions League. It was founded in August 2012 by the creation of Afghan Premier League and its players have been chosen through a casting-show called Maidon-E-Sabz (Green Field). Based in the city of Mazar-i-Sharif, club represents  provinces of Balkh, Samangan, Sar-e Pol, Jowzjan and Faryab in the northwestern region of Afghanistan.

They have claimed both runners-up positions in first two years of Afghan Premier League.

History
The club is named after mythical creature Simorgh – a large, graceful, winged bird – and the sacred mountain Alborz, both famous elements of ancient Persian mythology, referred to in many famous poems and, according to a legend, linked to the region around Balkh and Samangan. 

Koh e Alburz is the name of a mountain ridge south of the ancient city of Balkh. Likewise, Simorgh Alborz football team represents north and northwestern Afghanistan, including the historical region of Balkh.

References

Football clubs in Afghanistan
Mazar-i-Sharif
2012 establishments in Afghanistan
Association football clubs established in 2012